Big L was the name of a short-lived broadcasting company registered by the British licensing authority Ofcom from 11 June 2002 to 10 June 2003 for a satellite radio service known as Big L. The license stated that the station "… will provide an eclectic mix of rock and pop, both modern and classic. News and weather will be broadcast hourly. The service will be in English language and will be free to air." The station was owned by Big L Limited. Though the station targeted audience in the United Kingdom, advertisers developed their commercials mainly to reach English speakers in the Netherlands.

Presenters and staff
The station's presenters included former Saturday Superstore host Mike Read, who presented a morning show, as well as other former BBC Radio 1 DJs like Adrian John and David Hamilton. To recapture a similar working environment to the days of the pirate ships (such as the original Wonderful Radio London) all the DJs lived together at the same house in Frinton-on-Sea, along with station manager Chris Vezey, a former BBC Radio 2 producer who was also programme controller at Classic FM.

Station licence
The station's Ofcom licence stated the station was under the ownership of Big L Limited, 1 Colmore Crescent, Moseley, Birmingham B13 9SJ.

Independent media evaluation of Big L 1395
Big L 1395 was featured on Channel 4 programme Get Your Act Together With Harvey Goldsmith in an episode broadcast 17 April 2007. Presenter Harvey Goldsmith attempted to improve the fortunes of the station but met with resistance and failed to deliver on his promises.

Transmitter information
The station was broadcast on 1395 kHz (215 m) Medium Wave from a transmitter in the Netherlands, and the Internet.

Big L returned to 1395 kHz on 3 December 2009, but on 25 January 2011 this 1395 kHz transmitter was switched off and the station currently broadcasts on the internet only.

References

External links
Big L 1395 official website
Big L Limited

Radio stations in the United Kingdom